Johnson House is a historic home and farm complex located at Cape Vincent in Jefferson County, New York.  The limestone farmhouse was built about 1840 and is a -story five-bay structure.  Also on the property is a barn, a shed, and two corn cribs.

It was listed on the National Register of Historic Places in 1985.

References

Houses on the National Register of Historic Places in New York (state)
Houses completed in 1840
Houses in Jefferson County, New York
National Register of Historic Places in Jefferson County, New York